The following is a list of works by Thérèse Schwartze that are generally accepted as autograph by the Cora Hollema catalog and other sources.

Sources

 Thérèse Schwartze (1851-1918). Een vorstelijk portrettiste, C. Hollema en P. Kouwenhoven, Zutphen, 1998
 Thérèse Schwartze in the RKD

Thérèse Schwartze
Schwartze